The discography of American composer, musician, singer, producer, and multi-instrumentalist Varien.  Genres have been cited as industrial, metal, orchestral, neofolk, and ambient music.  This includes material that has been credited under their stage names Chrono Rabbit, Halo Nova, Koinu, as well as their names Nick Kaelar and Nikki Kaelar.

Discography

Studio albums

Extended plays

Singles

As Varien

As Halo Nova

As Koinu

Remixes

Film, television, and video games

Kaelar's music has appeared in the following works:

References

Discographies of American artists
Rock music discographies
Film and television discographies